The Party's Just Begun Tour is the second tour by American girl group, The Cheetah Girls. It supported the soundtrack to their second film, The Cheetah Girls 2. The tour started on September 15, 2006, in Seattle and ended on March 4, 2007, in Houston. The concerts in Anaheim and San Diego were recorded and released as In Concert: The Party's Just Begun Tour.

Background
The tour was originally going to be 40 cities, as stated by Sabrina Bryan on Live with Regis and Kelly, then 58 cities, but the final date transition was an 86 date tour. For the final date on the tour the Cheetah Girls performed at the Houston Livestock Show and Rodeo with Miley Cyrus as the opening act. The show sold 73,291 becoming one of the biggest concert of the event's history.

The storyline of this show was that Dr. Coolcatz (played by Mitchel Musso) send the girls on a mission to gather the ingredients for growl power. The ingredients are: Dreams, love, and friendship. They find the ingredients by singing and dancing to their crowds.

The setlist primarily includes songs from The Cheetah Girls 2 soundtrack as well as the first Cheetah Girls soundtrack. Also included was an exclusive track, "Falling for You", an unreleased song by Bailon and Williams' other girl group 3LW.

Opening acts
 Miley Cyrus as Hannah Montana (September 15–October 15, 2006; March 4, 2007)
 Everlife (September 19–20; September 30; October 6; October 10; October 14–15; November 27–December 31, 2006; January 3–February 4, 2007)
 Jordan Pruitt (September 15–17; September 21–29, October 1–5; October 9; October 11–13; October 17–November 16, 2006)
 Vanessa Hudgens (October 17–November 16, 2006)
 Los Nēnēs (November 18, 2006)
 Angels (November 18, 2006)
 T-Squad (January 9–30, 2007)

Setlist 
Although not representative of all concerts for the duration of the tour, the average set list looked like this:
"The Party's Just Begun"
"Shake a Tail Feather"
"Together We Can"
"Route 66"
"If I Never Knew You"
"Girls Just Want to Have Fun"
"Cheetah-licious"
"Strut"
"I Won't Say (I'm in Love)"
"Falling for You"
"Cinderella"
"Step Up"
"Girl Power"
"Cheetah Sisters"
"Cheetah-licious Christmas"
"Amigas Cheetahs"

Tour dates 

Festivals and other miscellaneous performances
Houston Livestock Show and Rodeo

Box office score data

References

The Cheetah Girls
2006 concert tours
2007 concert tours